Josh Hoover is an American politician serving as a member of the California State Assembly from the 7th district, which includes the Sacramento County suburbs of Rancho Cordova, Fair Oaks, Folsom, and Citrus Heights. He assumed office on December 5, 2022 after defeating incumbent Democrat Ken Cooley in the November general election.

Early life and education
Hoover was born in Folsom, California. He earned a bachelor's degree in political science and public policy at the University of California, Los Angeles and a master's degree in public administration from the University of Southern California.

Career
Hoover had worked as a legislative aide for 11 years. Prior to being elected to the State Assembly, Hoover was the Chief of Staff for California State Assemblyman Kevin Kiley. He also served on the Folsom Cordova Unified School District. In January 2022, Hoover announced his campaign for the newly drawn 7th Assembly District. He placed second in the nonpartisan blanket primary and defeated long-serving Democratic Assemblyman Ken Cooley in the November general election.

Personal life
Hoover lives in Folsom with his wife Nicole and their three children. He is Latino.

Election results

2022

References

External links

Living people
21st-century American politicians
Republican Party members of the California State Assembly
University of California, Los Angeles alumni
University of Southern California alumni
American politicians of Mexican descent
Year of birth missing (living people)